The World Heavyweight Championship was a professional wrestling world heavyweight championship of the National Wrestling Association (NWA), an offshoot of the National Boxing Association (NBA).

The title existed from 1929 through 1949, when it was unified with the National Wrestling Alliance's World Heavyweight Championship.

Title history

References

External links
Wrestling-Titles.com

World Heavyweight
World heavyweight wrestling championships